European route E76 forms part of the United Nations International E-road network. Its course lies entirely within Italy, where it connects Migliarino Pisano, near Pisa, to Florence, by way of Lucca, Pistoia, and Prato.

Earlier E-road numbering 
Prior to the revision of E-road numbering in 1992, the number E76 referred to a road in Norway, now numbered E134.

Route 

 : Pisa - Lucca - Capannori - Pistoia - Prato - Sesto Fiorentino - Florence

External links 
 UN Economic Commission for Europe: Overall Map of E-road Network (2007)

76
E076